Bokor is a Vodou sorcerer.

Bokor may also refer to
Bokor (surname)
Bokor, Hungary, a village
Bokor Hill Station, a collection of French colonial buildings atop Bokor Mountain in Cambodia

See also
Boqor